Gul Khan may refer to:
 Gul Khan (cricketer) (born 1973), former Pakistani cricketer
 Gul Khan (producer), Indian television producer, writer and director
 Gul Hassan Khan (1921–1999), Pakistan Army general
 Gul Mohammad Khan (1876–1979), Bangladeshi musician